The tenth and final season of The Fairly OddParents had 20 episodes ordered on December 15, 2015, and premiered on January 15, 2016 and ended on July 26, 2017 on both Nickelodeon and Nicktoons. The season was produced by Billionfold Inc., Frederator Studios, and Nickelodeon Animation Studio.

Production
Nickelodeon announced this season on August 18, 2015. A total of 20 episodes were ordered after the initial order of seven. It was originally 13.
Starting with "Space Ca-Dad", the show's animation made a transition from traditional animation to Adobe Flash animation.

Episodes

Notes

Ratings

References 

The Fairly OddParents seasons
2016 American television seasons
2017 American television seasons